Kristin Kay Mayes (born September 6, 1971) is an American reporter, lawyer, and politician who is the Arizona Attorney General. A member of the Democratic Party, Mayes was elected in 2022, defeating Republican Abraham Hamadeh by a margin of just 280 votes, making this one of the closest elections in the state's history. Previously Mayes was a Professor of Practice at Sandra Day O'Connor College of Law and Chair of the Arizona Corporation Commission.

Mayes is the second woman elected Arizona Attorney General (after Janet Napolitano), the third openly lesbian woman elected attorney general of a state in the United States (after Maura Healey and Dana Nessel), and the second openly LGBT person elected to statewide office in Arizona (after Kyrsten Sinema).

Early life and education 
Mayes was born and raised in Prescott, Arizona. After graduating from Prescott High School she attended Arizona State University (ASU) on scholarship from the Flinn Foundation. While attending ASU she served as editor in chief of the State Press, the university's newspaper. In addition, Mayes won the Harry S. Truman Scholarship. She graduated valedictorian from ASU with a degree in political science.

Journalism career 

Mayes worked as a general assignment reporter for the Phoenix Gazette, and later as a political reporter for The Arizona Republic, covering the Arizona State Legislature. Mayes then attended graduate school at Columbia University in New York, where she earned a Master of Public Administration.

Following graduate school, Mayes returned to The Arizona Republic, where she was assigned to cover the 2000 presidential campaigns of Senator John McCain, former Vice President Dan Quayle, publisher Steve Forbes and Governor George W. Bush. During this time Mayes co-authored a book entitled Spin Priests: Campaign Advisors and the 2000 Race for the White House. After the presidential campaign, Mayes attended ASU College of Law and graduated magna cum laude.

Arizona Corporation Commission 
Mayes was appointed to the Arizona Corporation Commission in October 2003. She devoted much of her effort towards pipeline safety, renewable energy and natural gas issues.

Mayes was elected to a full term in a 2004 special election, defeating Libertarian nominee Rick Fowlkes.

Term-limited in 2010, she was succeeded by fellow Republican Brenda Burns.

In 2019, Mayes left the Republican Party and joined the Democratic Party, citing the expansion of Trumpism within the Republican Party.

Arizona Attorney General 
Mayes was the Democratic nominee for the 2022 Arizona Attorney General election, running against Republican Abraham Hamadeh. In the final vote tally, Mayes led by 510 votes. The race was one of the closest in Arizona history and required a mandatory recount because the vote difference was significantly less than the 0.5% vote threshold required by state law for recounts. The recount started on December 5. On December 29, Judge Timothy Thomason announced the results of the recount, confirming Mayes as the winner with a reduced margin of 280 votes.

Electoral history

See also 
 List of female state attorneys general in the United States

References

Notes

External links
 Arizona Attorney General Kris Mayes official state government site
 Kris Mayes for Arizona Attorney General campaign website
 Official Arizona Corporation Commissioner profile
 

1971 births
21st-century American journalists
21st-century American lawyers
21st-century American women lawyers
21st-century American women politicians
21st-century American women writers
American political journalists
American politicians who switched parties
American newspaper reporters and correspondents
American LGBT politicians
American women journalists
Arizona Attorneys General
Arizona Democrats
Arizona Republicans
Arizona State University alumni
Journalists from Arizona
LGBT people from Arizona
LGBT lawyers
Living people
Politicians from Prescott, Arizona
Sandra Day O'Connor College of Law alumni
School of International and Public Affairs, Columbia University alumni
Women in Arizona politics